Elmer Ewert (born 19 September 1934) is a Canadian archer. He competed in the men's individual event at the 1972 Summer Olympics.

References

External links
 

1934 births
Living people
Canadian male archers
Olympic archers of Canada
Archers at the 1972 Summer Olympics
Sportspeople from St. Catharines
20th-century Canadian people
21st-century Canadian people